The Peene is a river in Germany.

Geography 
The Westpeene, with the Ostpeene as its longer tributary, and the Kleine Peene/Teterower Peene (with a Peene  without specification (or Nordpeene) as its smaller and shorter affluent) flows into Kummerower See (Lake Kummerow), and from there as Peene proper to Anklam and into the Oder Lagoon.

The western branch of the Oder River, which separates the island of Usedom from the German mainland, is often also called Peene, but actually is considered a part of the Baltic Sea called the Peenestrom. It is one of three channels connecting the Oder Lagoon with the Bay of Pomerania of the Baltic Sea. (The other channels are the Świna and the Dziwna.)

Hydrography 
The Peene river itself has some properties of an inlet. From Kummerower See, inclusively, to the mouth, the ground of the water is five feet and more below sea level. The windkessel effect of the large surface of this lake allows reverse flows that with northern wind may last as long as a week. These reverse flows do not only occur in times of low discharge of its effluent, but also in times of an overflow of precipitation.

Ecology 
The Peene Valley is one of the largest contiguous fen regions in central Europe. Thanks to its wilderness and intact nature, the river Peene and its valley is sometimes grandiloquently referred to as "the Amazon of the North".

Major towns at the Peene river are Malchin, Teterow, Demmin and Anklam.

Wolgast is on Peenestrom strait.

References

External links 
 
 www.peenetal-landschaft.de - Association for natural protection of the Peene river valley (German)

Rivers of Mecklenburg-Western Pomerania
Federal waterways in Germany
 
Rivers of Germany